The Breda Ba.44 was a biplane airliner developed in Italy in the mid-1930s and which saw limited military service when impressed into the Regia Aeronautica as transports.

Design and development
The design of the Ba.44 was developed from that of the de Havilland Dragon Rapide, for which Breda had purchased a manufacturing licence. Breda engineers believed that making some changes would better suit the aircraft to the company's manufacturing techniques, the biggest differences in the prototype Ba.44 being the design of the cockpit and empennage, and the change to locally produced Colombo S.63 engines. In production, however, these were changed back to the same de Havilland Gipsy Six engines as the Dragon Rapide.

Operational history
Four examples were purchased by Ala Littoria, which utilized it on its Albanian routes, while the prototype was sold to the Regia Aeronautica, which deployed it as a VIP transport and air ambulance in Libya. The pleasing performance of the aircraft in this role led to the air force impressing the civil Ba.44s in 1936.

The government of Paraguay purchased one Ba.44 for its Military Aviation in 1933 and it was used as an air ambulance/transport in the Chaco War. In 1945, this Ba.44 was transferred to the first Paraguayan Airline, L.A.T.N. (Líneas Aéreas de Transporte Nacional) and was withdrawn from service in 1947.

Besides North Africa, the Ba.44s saw service in the Italian campaigns in Albania, Greece, and Yugoslavia.

Operators

Ala Littoria received 4 aircraft, all were taken over by military aviation.
Regia Aeronautica received prototype and took over four civilian aircraft in 1936.

Paraguayan Air Arm bought one aircraft in air ambulance/transport variant.
Líneas Aéreas de Transporte Nacional (LATN) used one ex-Paraguayan Air Arm Ba.44.

Specifications

See also

References

Bibliography

 Sapienza Fracchia, Antonio Luis: "La Contribución Italiana en la Aviación Paraguaya". Author's edition. Asunción. 2007.

External links

 Уголок неба

Ba.044
1930s Italian airliners
Biplanes
Aircraft first flown in 1934
Twin piston-engined tractor aircraft